Młyny  is a village in the administrative district of Gmina Rudniki, within Olesno County, Opole Voivodeship, in south-western Poland.

The village has a population of 331.

References

Villages in Olesno County